Alfius is a genus of Chrysomelinae (leaf beetles) endemic to Queensland, Australia.

Species
Three species are included in the genus:
Alfius hieroglyphicus (Lea, 1929)
Alfius pictus (Lea, 1929)
Alfius pictipennis (Lea, 1929)

References

Chrysomelidae genera
Chrysomelinae
Beetles of Australia